Robert C. Graham House, also known as Mimi's House and the Kelly-Graham House, is a historic home located at Washington, Daviess County, Indiana.  It was built in 1912, and is a large two-story, Prairie School style glazed red brick dwelling.  It has a low pitched hipped roof with wide overhanging eaves and covered with green Spanish tile.  Its porches feature mosaic tile floors.  From 1918 to 1967, it was the home of automobile manufacturer Robert C. Graham (1885-1967).

It was added to the National Register of Historic Places in 1983.

References

Washington, Indiana
Houses on the National Register of Historic Places in Indiana
Prairie School architecture in Indiana
Houses completed in 1912
Houses in Daviess County, Indiana
National Register of Historic Places in Daviess County, Indiana
1912 establishments in Indiana